This article lists political parties in Tanzania.  The country operates under a dominant multi-party system with the ruling party being in power since the nation attained its independence in 1961. It first governed as the Tanganyika African National Union, before merging with the Afro-Shirazi Party to form the Chama Cha Mapinduzi.

Brief history and overview
Tanzania attained its independence as Tanganyika Territory from the United Kingdom in 1961 with the Tanganyika African National Union (TANU) forming its first government. Following the Zanzibar Revolution in 1964, it merged with the People's Republic of Zanzibar and Pemba to form the United Republic of Tanganyika and Zanzibar (present day Tanzania). It thereafter became a one-party state with TANU and the Afro-Shirazi Party (ASP) being the only parties operating on the mainland and the Zanzibar Archipelago respectively.

On 5 February 1977, TANU merged with its Zanzibari counterpart, the ASP to form the Chama Cha Mapinduzi which served as the sole legal party until 1992 when multi-party system was re-introduced. The country also adopted the Structural Adjustment Program upon recommendation of the Bretton Woods Institutions.

Since the re-introduction of the multi-party system, the CCM has continued to retain its popularity and the voter's confidence, having won all general elections since 1995. Jakaya Kikwete, the party's presidential candidate in 2005 won the election by a landslide victory receiving more than 80% of the popular vote.

List

Defunct parties
Afro-Shirazi Party (ASP)
Attentive Democracy Party (MAKINI)
Tanganyika African National Union (TANU)
Tanzania Labour Party (TLP)
Traditional Dhow
National League for Democracy (NLD)
Zanzibar and Pemba People's Party (ZPPP)
Zanzibar Nationalist Party (ZNP)

See also
Politics of Tanzania
List of political parties by country

References

External links
Official website of the National Electoral Commission

Tanzania
 
Political parties
Political parties
Tanzania